St. Paul's Lutheran Church may refer to:

in the United States (by state)
St. Paulus Lutheran Church, formerly listed on the National Register of Historic Places in San Francisco, California
St. Paulus Evangelisch Lutherischen Gemeinde, listed on the National Register of Historic Places in Jonesboro, Illinois
St. Paul Lutheran Church (Davenport, Iowa)
St. Paul's Lutheran Church (Ashland, Kentucky)
St. Paul Lutheran Church (Mansura, Louisiana), listed on the National Register of Historic Places
St. Paul's Evangelical Lutheran Church & Parsonage, listed on the National Register of Historic Places in Minneota, Minnesota
St. Paul's Church (New Melle, Missouri), also known as St. Paul's Lutheran Church
St. Paul's Lutheran Church, Parsonage and Cemetery, listed on the National Register of Historic Places in Dutchess County, New York
St. Paul's Evangelical Lutheran Church (Berne, New York), listed on the National Register of Historic Places in Albany County, New York
St. Paul's Evangelical Lutheran Church (Liberty, New York), listed on the National Register of Historic Places in Sullivan County, New York
St. Paul's Lutheran Church (Oak Hill, New York), listed on the National Register of Historic Places in Greene County, New York
St. Paul's Lutheran Church (Washington, D.C.)
St. Paul's (Zion's) Evangelical Lutheran Church in Red Hook, New York
St. Paul's Lutheran Church Historic District, listed on the National Register of Historic Places in Schoharie County, New York.
St. Paul's Church and Cemetery (Newton, North Carolina), also known as St. Paul's Lutheran Church
St. Paul's Lutheran Church (Hazen, North Dakota), listed on the National Register of Historic Places in Mercer County, North Dakota
St. Paul Evangelical Lutheran Church (Appleton, Wisconsin), listed on the National Register of Historic Places in Appleton, Wisconsin

in Europe
St. Paul's Lutheran Church, Riga

See also
St. Paul's Church (disambiguation)